This is a list of the bird species recorded in American Samoa. The avifauna of American Samoa include a total of 75 species as of 2021, according to Bird Checklists of the World. Of them, 15 are rare or accidental, four have been introduced by humans, and one, the mao, is extirpated. American Samoa has no endemic bird species but several near-endemics occur and many of the land birds occur in good numbers. A variety of seabirds breed in the islands. Hunting and introduced predators have reduced their numbers but there are still some important breeding sites such as Lata Mountain on Ta'u Island.

This list's taxonomic treatment (designation and sequence of orders, families and species) and nomenclature (English and scientific names) are those of The Clements Checklist of Birds of the World, 2022 edition.

The following tags have been used to highlight several categories of occurrence.

 (A) Accidental - a species that rarely or accidentally occurs in American Samoa
 (I) Introduced - a species introduced to American Samoa as a consequence, direct or indirect, of human actions
 (Ex) Extirpated - a species that no longer occurs in American Samoa although populations exist elsewhere

Ducks, geese, and waterfowl

Order: AnseriformesFamily: Anatidae

Anatidae includes the ducks and most duck-like waterfowl, such as geese and swans. These birds are adapted to an aquatic existence with webbed feet, flattened bills, and feathers that are excellent at shedding water due to an oily coating.

Northern shoveler, Spatula clypeata (A)
Pacific black duck, Anas superciliosa
Eastern spot-billed duck, Anas zonorhyncha

Pheasants, grouse, and allies
Order: GalliformesFamily: Phasianidae

The Phasianidae are a family of terrestrial birds which consists of quails, partridges, snowcocks, francolins, spurfowls, tragopans, monals, pheasants, peafowls, and jungle fowls. In general, they are plump (although they vary in size) and have broad, relatively short wings.

Red junglefowl, Gallus gallus (I)

Pigeons and doves

Order: ColumbiformesFamily: Columbidae

Pigeons and doves are stout-bodied birds with short necks and short slender bills with a fleshy cere.

Rock pigeon, Columba livia (A)
Shy ground dove, Alopecoenas stairi
Many-colored fruit-dove, Ptilinopus perousii
Crimson-crowned fruit-dove, Ptilinopus porphyraceus
Pacific imperial-pigeon, Ducula pacifica

Cuckoos
Order: CuculiformesFamily: Cuculidae

The family Cuculidae includes cuckoos, roadrunners, and anis. These birds are of variable size with slender bodies, long tails, and strong legs. The Old World cuckoos are brood parasites.

Long-tailed koel, Urodynamis taitensis

Swifts
Order: CaprimulgiformesFamily: Apodidae

Swifts are small birds which spend the majority of their lives flying. These birds have very short legs and never settle voluntarily on the ground, perching instead only on vertical surfaces. Many swifts have long swept-back wings which resemble a crescent or boomerang.

White-rumped swiftlet, Aerodramus spodiopygius
Australian swiftlet, Aerodramus terraereginae

Rails, gallinules, and coots

Order: GruiformesFamily: Rallidae

Rallidae is a large family of small to medium-sized birds which includes the rails, crakes, coots, and gallinules. Typically they inhabit dense vegetation in damp environments near lakes, swamps, or rivers. In general they are shy and secretive birds, making them difficult to observe. Most species have strong legs and long toes which are well adapted to soft uneven surfaces. They tend to have short, rounded wings and to be weak fliers.

Buff-banded rail, Gallirallus philippensis
Black-backed swamphen, Porphyrio indicus
Australasian swamphen, Porphyrio melanotus
Spotless crake, Zapornia tabuensis

Plovers and lapwings

Order: CharadriiformesFamily: Charadriidae

The family Charadriidae includes the plovers, dotterels, and lapwings. They are small to medium-sized birds with compact bodies, short thick necks, and long, usually pointed, wings. They are found in open country worldwide, mostly in habitats near water.

Pacific golden-plover, Pluvialis fulva
Masked lapwing, Vanellus miles (A)

Sandpipers and allies

Order: CharadriiformesFamily: Scolopacidae

Scolopacidae is a large diverse family of small to medium-sized shorebirds including the sandpipers, curlews, godwits, shanks, tattlers, woodcocks, snipes, dowitchers, and phalaropes. The majority of these species eat small invertebrates picked out of the mud or soil. Variation in length of legs and bills enables multiple species to feed in the same habitat, particularly on the coast, without direct competition for food.

Bristle-thighed curlew, Numenius tahitiensis
Whimbrel, Numenius phaeopus (A)
Bar-tailed godwit, Limosa lapponica
Ruddy turnstone, Arenaria interpres
Sanderling, Calidris alba
Wandering tattler, Tringa incana

Gulls, terns, and skimmers

Order: CharadriiformesFamily: Laridae

Laridae is a family of medium to large seabirds, the gulls, terns, and skimmers. Gulls are typically gray or white, often with black markings on the head or wings. They have stout, longish bills and webbed feet. Terns are a group of generally medium to large seabirds typically with gray or white plumage, often with black markings on the head. Most terns hunt fish by diving but some pick insects off the surface of fresh water. Terns are generally long-lived birds, with several species known to live in excess of 30 years.

Laughing gull, Leucophaeus atricilla (A)
Brown noddy, Anous stolidus
Black noddy, Anous minutus
Blue-gray noddy, Anous ceruleus
White tern, Gygis alba
Sooty tern, Onychoprion fuscatus
Gray-backed tern, Onychoprion lunatus
Bridled tern, Onychoprion anaethetus (A)
Black-naped tern, Sterna sumatrana (A)
Greater crested tern, Thalasseus bergii (A)

Tropicbirds

Order: PhaethontiformesFamily: Phaethontidae

Tropicbirds are slender white birds of tropical oceans, with exceptionally long central tail feathers. Their heads and long wings have black markings.

White-tailed tropicbird, Phaethon lepturus
Red-tailed tropicbird, Phaethon rubricauda

Southern storm-petrels
Order: ProcellariiformesFamily: Oceanitidae

The southern storm-petrels are relatives of the petrels and are the smallest seabirds. They feed on planktonic crustaceans and small fish picked from the surface, typically while hovering. The flight is fluttering and sometimes bat-like.

White-faced storm-petrel, Pelagodroma marina (A)
Black-bellied storm-petrel, Fregetta tropica (A)
Polynesian storm-petrel, Nesofregetta fuliginosa

Shearwaters and petrels

Order: ProcellariiformesFamily: Procellariidae

The procellariids are the main group of medium-sized "true petrels", characterised by united nostrils with medium septum and a long outer functional primary.

Herald petrel, Pterodroma heraldica
Mottled petrel, Pterodroma inexpectata (A)
White-necked petrel, Pterodroma cervicalis
Black-winged petrel, Pterodroma nigripennis (A)
Gould's petrel, Pterodroma leucoptera
Collared petrel, Pterodroma brevipes
Phoenix petrel, Pterodroma alba
Tahiti petrel, Pterodroma rostrata
Flesh-footed shearwater, Ardenna carneipes (A)
Wedge-tailed shearwater, Ardenna pacificus
Sooty shearwater, Ardenna griseus
Short-tailed shearwater, Ardenna tenuirostris
Christmas shearwater, Puffinus nativitatis
Newell's shearwater, Puffinus newelli (A)
Tropical shearwater, Puffinus bailloni

Frigatebirds

Order: SuliformesFamily: Fregatidae

Frigatebirds are large seabirds usually found over tropical oceans. They are large, black-and-white, or completely black, with long wings and deeply forked tails. The males have colored inflatable throat pouches. They do not swim or walk and cannot take off from a flat surface. Having the largest wingspan-to-body-weight ratio of any bird, they are essentially aerial, able to stay aloft for more than a week.

Lesser frigatebird, Fregata ariel
Great frigatebird, Fregata minor

Boobies and gannets

Order: SuliformesFamily: Sulidae

The sulids comprise the gannets and boobies. Both groups are medium to large coastal seabirds that plunge-dive for fish.

Masked booby, Sula dactylatra
Brown booby, Sula leucogaster
Red-footed booby, Sula sula

Herons, egrets, and bitterns

Order: PelecaniformesFamily: Ardeidae

The family Ardeidae contains the bitterns, herons, and egrets. Herons and egrets are medium to large wading birds with long necks and legs. Bitterns tend to be shorter necked and more wary. Members of Ardeidae fly with their necks retracted, unlike other long-necked birds such as storks, ibises, and spoonbills.

White-faced heron, Egretta novaehollandiae (A)
Pacific reef-heron, Egretta sacra

Barn-owls

Order: StrigiformesFamily: Tytonidae

Barn-owls are medium to large owls with large heads and characteristic heart-shaped faces. They have long strong legs with powerful talons.

Barn owl, Tyto alba

Kingfishers

Order: CoraciiformesFamily: Alcedinidae

Kingfishers are medium-sized birds with large heads, long pointed bills, short legs, and stubby tails.

Pacific kingfisher, Todirhamphus sacer
Collared kingfisher, Todiramphus chloris

Old World parrots

Order: PsittaciformesFamily: Psittaculidae

Characteristic features of parrots include a strong curved bill, an upright stance, strong legs, and clawed zygodactyl feet. Many parrots are vividly colored, and some are multi-colored. In size they range from 8 cm (3.1 in) to 1 m (3.3 ft) in length. Old World parrots are found from Africa east across south and southeast Asia and Oceania to Australia and New Zealand.

Blue-crowned lorikeet, Vini australis

Honeyeaters

Order: PasseriformesFamily: Meliphagidae

The honeyeaters are a large and diverse family of small to medium-sized birds most common in Australia and New Guinea. They are nectar feeders and closely resemble other nectar-feeding passerines.

Samoan myzomela, Myzomela nigriventris
Mao, Gymnomyza samoensis (Ex)
Eastern wattled-honeyeater, Foulehaio carunculatus

Monarch flycatchers
Order: PasseriformesFamily: Monarchidae

The monarch flycatchers are small to medium-sized insectivorous passerines which hunt by flycatching.

Fiji shrikebill, Clytorhynchus vitiensis

Bulbuls

Order: PasseriformesFamily: Pycnonotidae

Bulbuls are medium-sized songbirds. Some are colorful with yellow, red, or orange vents, cheeks, throats or supercilia, but most are drab, with uniform olive-brown to black plumage. Some species have distinct crests.

Red-vented bulbul, Pycnonotus cafer (I)

Starlings

Order: PasseriformesFamily: Sturnidae

Starlings are small to medium-sized passerine birds. Their flight is strong and direct and they are very gregarious. Their preferred habitat is fairly open country. They eat insects and fruit. Plumage is typically dark with a metallic sheen.

Polynesian starling, Aplonis tabuensis
Samoan starling, Aplonis atrifusca
Common myna, Acridotheres tristis (I)
Jungle myna, Acridotheres fuscus (I)

Thrushes

Order: PasseriformesFamily: Turdidae

The thrushes are a group of passerine birds that occur mainly but not exclusively in the Old World. They are plump, soft plumaged, small to medium-sized insectivores or sometimes omnivores, often feeding on the ground. Many have attractive songs.

Island thrush, Turdus poliocephalus

References

See also
List of mammals of American Samoa
List of non-marine molluscs of American Samoa
List of birds
Lists of birds by region

American Samoa
 
Birds